Phalaenopsis × lotubela is a species of epiphytic orchid native to the island Sumatra of Indonesia. It is a hybrid of Phalaenopsis cornu-cervi and Phalaenopsis javanica.

Discovery
This species was first noticed to be distinct in 2018 by Gus Benk, who had found it among other Phalaenopsis species, such as Phalaenopsis cornu-cervi, Phalaenopsis javanica and Phalaenopsis fimbriata. It had previously been known by local people.

Etymology
The specific epithet lotubela is derived from the name, which local people call this species. It refers to the hill, where it was found.

Description
Phalaenopsis × lotubela is an epiphytic plant with 5–7, 12–20 cm long and 6–9 cm wide leaves. The pendent, 14–18 cm long inflorescence bears 5–10, sequentially opening, 3-3.5 cm wide flowers with a yellow ground colour and redish brown transverse barring. The sepals have acute tips. The labellum, which bears white trichomes, is 1 cm long and 0.5 cm wide.

References 

lotubela
Orchid hybrids
Hybrid plants
Plant nothospecies
Interspecific plant hybrids
Plants described in 2018
Orchids of Indonesia
Orchids of Sumatra